Tatyana Ivanovna Gomolko (née Machigina in 1940) is a retired Russian rower who won two European titles, in 1967 and 1969. Her husband Nikolay Gomolko also competed internationally in rowing.

References

1940 births
Living people
Russian female rowers
Soviet female rowers
European Rowing Championships medalists